Brigitte DeMeyer is an American singer-songwriter. Her music has Americana, blues, folk, country and gospel-music influences. She is known for her "spicy vocal delivery".

Early life and education
DeMeyer grew up in Point Loma, San Diego, where she attended Point Loma High School. She earned a degree in International Relations from University of San Diego in 1986.

Career
DeMeyer started her musical career in San Diego and was mentored by long-time San Diego musician Steve Poltz as well as the Beat Farmers' singer and guitarist Joey Harris. Before going solo, she was a member of the Pink Expectations and of Mojo Nixon's Syndicate of Soul band. She has opened for acts such as Bob Dylan, Dan Fogelberg, and Hall & Oates.

Since 2001, she has released six solo albums. Her 2014 album, Savannah Road, was inspired by Gregg Allman and has received attention on SiriusXM's Outlaw Country channel. In January 2017, she released Mockingbird Soul, a duet album with singer-guitarist Will Kimbrough.

Personal life
DeMeyer is married and has a son. She lived in San Francisco from 1986 until 2010, when she moved to Nashville.

Discography

Notes

References

External links

Brigitte DeMeyer in session at BBC

Year of birth missing (living people)
Living people
21st-century American women
American women singer-songwriters
Musicians from Nashville, Tennessee
Musicians from San Diego
Singer-songwriters from California
Singer-songwriters from Tennessee